Sport-Saller is a German sports equipment mail order company which focuses on association football products. The company was established in 1972 and is based in Weikersheim, Baden-Württemberg.

Sports-Saller sells and distributes football equipment for teams and clubs, mainly kit uniforms, balls, and boots. The company manufactures and commercilises not only its own products but other brands goods as well.

History 
Sport-Saller was created in 1972 in Tauberrettersheim, Germany, by Richard Saller, who was a football coach at that time. Saller originally started as a footballing business, but soon turned its attention to creating sporting goods company that develops, produces, and sells their own sportswear. Saller first opened a sportswear store with the idea of being able to equip local sports teams with the equipment they needed.

In 1990 Sport-Saller moved to Weikersheim where the company had built an office building, a sports shop, storage space, areas to organise dispatches, and areas for manufacturing. Along with the new office building a modern sports hall was built to help train motivated and talented young players. Saller also sponsor a series of initiatives with the company promoting and sponsoring a series of football and sports schools for children around Germany

In 2008 they replaced Uhlsport as the main suppliers of Arminia Bielefeld but lost the contract 12 years later to Joma Sport. In the past they also supplied Union Berlin replacing Nike in 2002 and 1. FC Köln in the years 2002-2005 until when they were replaced by Adidas.

The company expanded its operations to Georgia in 2008 and opened a trade centre in Tbilisi, supplying the Georgian Olympic Committee.

In 2010 they signed a contract with the Gambia Football Federation with the deal including all the national teams, namely U17, U20 and U23 teams, the senior national team and the female national team.

In 2014 they supplied the kits of Lechia Gdańsk on a 2 year contract.

In May 2018 they designed a special shirt for the last game of the season for Jahn Regensburg.

In 2020, they supplied kits of Sandecja Nowy Sącz.

Sponsorship teams 

Teams kits currently manufactured by Saller (2020)

Football

National teams  
 Gambia

Club teams 

 FC Alashkert 
 K.V.C. Westerlo
 K.F.C. Dessel Sport
 K.S.K. Heist
 Dinamo Brest
 Dinamo Minsk
 Neman
 FC Torpedo Kutaisi
 FC Saburtalo Tbilisi
 SSV Jahn Regensburg
 SC Paderborn 07
 VfR Aalen
 SC Wiedenbrück 2000
 Goslarer SC 08
 TuS Koblenz
 FC Einheit Rudolstadt
 SC Waldgirmes
 OSC Vellmar
 ASV Neumarkt
 TSV Röttingen 1895 e.V.
 SV Curslack-Neuengamme 
 SF Dorfmerkingen
 SV Waldhausen
 Meiendorfer SV
 1. FC Garmisch-Partenkirchen
 PAE Chania
 Horoya AC
 Sandecja Nowy Sącz
 Miedź Legnica
 UTA Arad
 Mash'al Mubarek
 FC Shurtan Guzar

Beach soccer

National teams 
 Germany

Fistball
 TV Oberndorf

Roller hockey
 RSC Cronenberg
 ERG Iserlohn

Volleyball
 TSV Röttingen 1895 e.V.

Former Sponsorships
Teams whose kits have previously been made by Saller

 Kuwait
 Gambia
 1. FC Köln
 1. FC Union Berlin
 AO Chania Kissamikos
 Arminia Bielefeld
 Germany national mini football team
 Békéscsaba
 Georgian Olympic Team
 Helmond Sport
 Lechia Gdańsk
 Lithuania

References

External links 

 

Sporting goods manufacturers of Germany
Clothing brands of Germany
Sportswear brands
Companies based in Baden-Württemberg
Clothing companies established in 1972
Multinational companies headquartered in Germany
1972 establishments in Germany